Ommen is a railway station at Ommen, Netherlands. The station is located 1 km south of the town center. The station was opened on 15 January 1903 and is located on the Zwolle–Emmen railway. Train services are operated by Arriva.

Previously, it was also the terminus of the Deventer-Ommen railway (1910–1935).

Train services

Bus services

References

External links
NS website 
Dutch Public Transport journey planner 

Railway stations in Overijssel
Railway stations opened in 1903
Railway stations on the Emmerlijn
Ommen